Tommy Rustad (born 3 September 1968, in Oslo) is a Norwegian auto racing driver. He currently drives in the FIA European Rallycross Championship and occasionally in the FIA World Rallycross Championship. Tommy is the son of former well known Norwegian racer Ola Rustad (1919-1999).

Racing career

Early Rallycross Years
Rustad started his motor sport career in karting before racing in the Norwegian Rallycross Championship, winning the so-called Supernasjonal title for six years in a row between 1987 and 1992. On 14 June 1992 he claimed overall victory in the Irish round of the European Rallycross Championship at Mondello Park, racing one of the two 650bhp strong Ford RS200 Group B cars of his compatriot and mentor Martin Schanche.

Single Seaters
In 1993 he switched to circuit racing, becoming the Swedish Formula Opel Champion in his first year. He drove in the Formula Opel Euroseries in 1994, finishing fifth in points, and finished sixth in the 1995 Eurocup Formula Renault. In 1996 he was in the Italian Formula Three Championship finishing ninth, and the Renault Spider Eurocup, finishing second in his first year, and was champion in 1997.

BTCC
In 1998 Rustad got a drive in the British Touring Car Championship. He drove a Renault Laguna for the DC Cook Motorsport team in the Michelin Independents Cup, despite getting some backing from the Renault works team. With five class wins throughout the seasons, he was crowned  independent champion. A sixteenth place overall finish saw him one place ahead of works Peugeot driver Tim Harvey.

STCC

Since his drive in the BTCC, he has spent most of his career driving in the Swedish Touring Car Championship. He was champion in both the STCC and the Norwegian Touring Car Championship in 2000, driving a works Nissan Primera. After this he spent a couple of seasons racing in the European Touring Car Championship, before returning to Sweden in 2003 in an Opel Astra. After another rallycross year he returned to the STCC Opel Team in 2007. 2008 had him drive a works Volvo C30 powered by bio-ethanol for Polestar Racing. He went on to win the championship for the second time in 2009 for Polestar.

WTCC
Rustad became the first Norwegian to drive in the World Touring Car Championship when his Polestar Racing team entered rounds 15 and 16 of the 2009 season at Brands Hatch. Rustad retired from both races.

Rallycross

In 2006 Rustad went back to rallycross for one year, forming a team with his compatriot Sverre Isachsen for to compete in the FIA European Championships for Rallycross Drivers where he eventually finished third overall with a Ford Focus T16 4x4.

After his retirement from tarmac racing, Rustad took the decision to return full-time to rallycross in 2013, driving a Volvo S40 Mk1 in all the rounds of the Norwegian Rallycross Championship for SuperNational cars with an engine capacity of over 2000cc. He was also seen in the two Scandinavian rounds (Norway and Sweden) of the 2013 European Rallycross Championship, driving a rented Volvo C30 SuperCar. In 2014 he participated in six of the twelve rounds of the inaugural FIA World Rallycross Championship, again racing a Volvo C30 SuperCar, but with little success. However, while finishing 27th of the final WorldRX standings only his sixth place overall in the EuroRX series was a much better result. For 2015 he was entrusted by his sponsor with a competitive VW Polo Mk5 SuperCar of the Volkswagen Team Marklund Motorsport, which he used successfully to claim his first European Rallycross title. Of the five rounds counting towards the EuroRX series Rustad won three, beating his strongest competitor Jérôme Grosset-Janin from France to second place.

Racing record

Complete British Touring Car Championship results
(key) (Races in bold indicate pole position – 1 point awarded all races) (Races in italics indicate fastest lap) (* signifies that driver lead feature race for at least one lap – 1 point awarded)

Complete European Touring Car Championship results
(key) (Races in bold indicate pole position) (Races in italics indicate fastest lap)

† — Did not finish the race, but was classified as he completed over 90% of the race distance.

Complete World Touring Car Championship results
(key) (Races in bold indicate pole position) (Races in italics indicate fastest lap)

† – Not eligible for points, as a guest driver.

Complete FIA World Rallycross Championship results
(key)

Supercar

Complete FIA European Rallycross Championship results
(key)

Division 2*

* ''Division 2 was rebranded as Division 1 in 1997.

Division 1

Supercar

External links

BTCC Pages Profile.

1968 births
Living people
Sportspeople from Oslo
Norwegian racing drivers
British Touring Car Championship drivers
Swedish Touring Car Championship drivers
World Touring Car Championship drivers
EFDA Nations Cup drivers
European Touring Car Championship drivers
European Rallycross Championship drivers
World Rallycross Championship drivers